Herculaneum was an ancient Roman city.

Herculaneum may also refer to:

Places
 Herculaneum (crater), on Mars
 Herculaneum, Missouri
 Băile Herculane, a spa town in Caraș-Severin, Romania
 Herculaneum Dock in Liverpool, UK
 Owen, Indiana, originally known as Herculaneum

Other uses
 Herculaneum Pottery, a pottery based in Toxteth, Liverpool, England. between 1793/94 and 1841
 Herculaneum, a fictional metal in the universe of Blake's 7 which comprises the hull of the Liberator.

See also
 Ercolano, an Italian town that surrounds and is named after the Roman city